Fiesa may refer to:
 Fiesa, Portorož, a street in the settlement of Portorož on the Adriatic coast in southwestern Slovenia
 the International Sand Sculpture Festival (FIESA), held annually in Pêra, Algarve